The Aisin Wings are a basketball team based in Anjo, Aichi, playing in the Women's Japan Basketball League.

Notable players

Maki Eguchi
Kadija Konate
Kiho Miyashita
Mayumi Yoshiyama

Coaches
Kagari Yamada

Practice facilities
Anjochiku Kibonooka Gymnasium

References

External links
 Official website

Basketball teams in Japan
Basketball teams established in 1979
1979 establishments in Japan